Misanthrope Immortel is the sixth studio album by the French avant-garde progressive death metal band Misanthrope.

Track listing

French track listing

 "Eden Massacre" - 4:57
 "Les Empereurs du Néant" - 5:39
 "Maimed Liberty" - 4:12
 "Les Lamentations du Diable" - 4:35
 "Khopirron" - 3:55
 "Au Baiser de Vermeil" - 5:40
 "Nuit Androgyne" - 5:10
 "The Soul Thrower" - 4:43
 "La Momie de Marianne" - 4:17
 "Conte Fantasmagorique" - 4:29
 "Tranchées 1914" - 5:11
 "Passion Millionaire" - 4:51
 "Espoir en Enfer" - 0:44

International track listing

 "Eden Massacre"
 "Emperors of Nothingness"
 "Maimed Liberty"
 "Diabolical Lamentations"
 "Khopirron"
 "Androgyne Night"
 "The Soul Thrower"
 "Exiled Existence"
 "Verdun 1917"
 "Millionaire Passion"
 "Le Roman Noir"
 "L'envol"

Tracks 11 and 12 are bonus tracks on the international version. Le Roman Noir is a live bootleg from 1999.

External links
Misanthrope Immortel @ Encyclopaedia Metallum

2000 albums
Misanthrope (band) albums